Marco Hernandez may refer to:
Marco A. Hernandez (born 1957), American attorney and judge in the state of Oregon
Marco Hernández (born 1992), Dominican Republic baseball player